Domiporta hebes is a species of sea snail, a marine gastropod mollusc in the family Mitridae, the miters or miter snails.

Description
The shell size varies between 10 mm and  70 mm

Distribution
This species is distributed in the Atlantic Ocean along West Africa, Cape Verde and Gabon.

References

 Bernard, P.A. (Ed.) (1984). Coquillages du Gabon [Shells of Gabon]. Pierre A. Bernard: Libreville, Gabon. 140, 75 plates
 Rolán E., 2005. Malacological Fauna From The Cape Verde Archipelago. Part 1, Polyplacophora and Gastropoda

External links
 Gastropods.com : Neocancilla hebes; accessed : 14 December 2010

Mitridae
Molluscs of the Atlantic Ocean
Gastropods of Cape Verde
Invertebrates of Gabon
Gastropods described in 1845